was a town located in Naoiri District, Ōita Prefecture, Japan.

As of 2003, the town had an estimated population of 3,454 and the density of 68.64 persons per km2. The total area was 50.32 km2.

On April 1, 2005, Ogi, along with the towns of Kujū and Naoiri (all from Naoiri District), was merged into the expanded city of Taketa.

Dissolved municipalities of Ōita Prefecture